The Snuts are a Scottish indie rock band formed in 2015, originating from West Lothian, Scotland. They have performed across the United Kingdom and Ireland. The band consists of Jack Cochrane (vocals and guitar), Joe McGillveray (guitar), Callum '29' Wilson (bass) and Jordan 'Joko' Mackay (drums) and was formed when the members were in school.

History 
Wilson, McGillveray and McKay went to primary school with each other and they met Cochrane at secondary school.

Wilson has said "we’ve only ever really played music together so I can’t really imagine it any other way". They have been influenced by the likes of the Libertines and Arctic Monkeys, and Scottish Ned culture growing up. They have also said that "one of our biggest inspirations is not to sound exactly like everybody else". Before going full time as a band, Cochrane was a joiner, Wilson was a slater/roofer, Mackay was a mechanic and McGillveray got qualifications to be a stonemason.

The band's debut single, the demo "Glasgow" was described as a 'stunning track with heaps of melody' and quickly lead to an ever since growing fanbase. After releasing several other demo singles in 2016, the Snuts released the self-produced EP The Matador in June 2017.

The Snuts released their first 'proper' single, "Seasons" in June 2018, described as 'conventional in a much-needed and refreshing way', a 'total throwback to the last renaissance of alternative music' and 'impeccably pieced together, designed to detonate on impact'. The following month, they then played at Scotland's TRNSMT Festival at the King Tut's Stage. In September, "Manhattan Project" was released, produced by Dave McCracken. In November 2018, the band signed with Parlophone Records. In March 2019, the band made their US debut at the South By South West festival in Austin, Texas, and their first single under Parlophone, "All Your Friends", was released in May. It was produced by Inflo and was the first single from their second EP Mixtape. It was described as having "an irresistibly catchy raw edge and a massive chorus" and Cochrane explained that it was a "new twist on a familiar social stigma around the drug epidemic that nobody seems to want to talk about".

In July 2019 they performed again at TRNSMT, this time on the Main Stage; in August they performed at the Reading and Leeds Festivals and also at Victorious Festival. The band's next single "Maybe California" was released in September 2019 and was produced by Rich Costey. "Juan Belmonte", named after the Spanish bullfighter, and also produced by Costey, was released in October. In January 2020, the Snuts released a cover of Bruno Mars' "When I Was Your Man" from sessions at the Firepit Recording Studios in London. Two further singles, "Fatboy Slim" (in "homage of Fatboy Slim's notorious set at Brighton beach" in 2002) and "Coffee & Cigarettes" were released before March, whereupon the EP Mixtape was released. The EP consists of 5 songs which showcase different influences and 4 interludes, which are studio outtakes, giving a kind of informal feel to the EP. The EP peaked at number 14 on the UK Albums Chart and also topped the Scottish Albums Chart, as well as the UK Vinyl Albums Chart. Following the success of Mixtape, the Snuts quickly released their next single, a cover of the Lovin' Spoonful's "Summer in the City". Like their previous cover song, this was a Firepit session. It was also featured in an advert for Strongbow cider in August 2020.

The following single "Elephants" was released in June 2020 and was produced by Tony Hoffer. It topped the iTunes Singles Chart on the day of its release. Cochrane described it as "another twist on our ever-growing diverse catalogue". In August, the band supported the Libertines at a socially-distanced performance at the Virgin Money Unity Arena in Newcastle. "That's All It Is" was released in September and features on the soundtrack to the video game FIFA 21. A week later, the Snuts released "Always", with Cochrane saying "the song depicts the message of falling in love with someone who in turn allows you to love yourself". "Always" was the final number one single on the Scottish Singles Chart before it was discontinued in December 2020.

In December, the band announced the release of their debut album W.L. on 19 March 2021, later pushed back to 2 April. It includes 10 previously released singles, three of which featured on the EP Mixtape, and three previously unreleased songs. The deluxe edition also includes four previously unreleased bonus tracks. In February 2021, a new single, "Somebody Loves You" was released in support of the Scottish Refugee Council, with the band donating the budget for the music video to the charity. Before its release, the Snuts performed the album at Stirling Castle and it was later released as a live album. W.L. debuted at number one on the UK Albums Chart, making the Snuts the first Scottish band to do so with their debut album since The View in 2007.

Because of COVID-19 restrictions, the band were unable to go on tour until the end of July, whereupon they began a UK tour. In October, they briefly toured the US, before returning to the UK to continue their tour there. Between January and February 2022, the Snuts supported the Kooks as an opening act for their nationwide tour promoting their upcoming album 10 Tracks to Echo in the Dark. In June, they supported Louis Tomlinson along with Californian band Sun Room for several performances in Mexico. From 28 June to 1 July 2022, the Snuts were the opening act for Kings of Leon during the latter's When You See Yourself tour.

In July 2021, the Snuts announced that they had already written their second album. In November, the first single, "Burn the Empire", was released. Several other singles were released in 2022, including a collaboration with Rachel Chinouriri entitled "End of the Road", and their album Burn the Empire was announced in June 2022 and released on 7 October 2022. However, in early September, following an online campaign by the band to make Parlophone release the album earlier, the release date was brought forward to 30 September. Burn the Empire peaked at number 3 on the UK Albums Chart.

Discography

Albums

Studio albums

Live albums

Extended plays

Singles

Music videos

Members

 Jack Cochrane – vocals, guitar (2015–present)
 Joe McGillveray – guitar (2015–present)
 Callum '29' Wilson – bass (2015–present)
 Jordan 'Joko' Mackay – drums (2015–present)

Notes

References

External links
 

Scottish indie rock groups
Musical groups established in 2015
2015 establishments in Scotland
Parlophone artists